Parozodera is a genus of beetles in the family Cerambycidae, containing the following species:

 Parozodera chemsaki Huedepohl, 1985
 Parozodera farinosa (Burmeister, 1865)

References

Trachyderini
Cerambycidae genera